The term looking-glass self was created by American sociologist Charles Horton Cooley in 1902, and introduced into his work Human Nature and the Social Order. It is described as our reflection of how we think we appear to others. Cooley takes into account three steps when using "the looking glass self". Step one is how one imagines one looks to other people. Step two is how one imagines the judgment of others based on how one thinks they view them. Step three is how one thinks of how the person views them based on their previous judgments.

According to Lisa McIntyre's The Practical Skeptic: Core Concepts in Sociology, the concept of the looking-glass self expresses the tendency for one to understand oneself through the perception which others may hold of them.

Three main components 
The looking-glass self comprises three main components that are unique to humans (Shaffer 2005).

 We imagine how we must appear to others in a social situation.
 We imagine and react to what we feel their judgment of that appearance must be.
 We develop our sense of self and respond through these perceived judgments of others.

The result is that individuals will change their behavior based on what they feel other people think about them, even if not necessarily true. In this way, social interaction acts as a "mirror" or a "looking-glass," since one's sense of self and self esteem is built off of others. For example, an individual may walk into a job interview with confidence and attempt to display this confidence. A person in this situation most often examines the reactions of the interviewers to see if they are positively or negatively reacting to it. If the individual notices positive reactions, such as nodding heads or smiles, this might further develop the individual's sense of self-confidence. If the individual notices negative reactions, such as a lack of interest, this confidence in self often becomes shaken and reformed in order to better oneself, even if the perceived judgments were not necessarily true.

Symbolic interaction
In hypothesizing the framework, "the mind is mental" because "the human mind is social". From the time they are born, humans define themselves within the context of their social interactions. Children learn that the symbol of their crying will elicit a response from their caregivers, not only when they are in need of necessities such as food or a diaper change, but also when they are in need of attention. Cooley best explains this interaction in On Self and Social Organization, noting that "a growing solidarity between mother and child parallels the child's increasing competence in using significant symbols.  This simultaneous development is itself a  necessary prerequisite for the child's ability to adopt the perspectives of other participants in social relationships and, thus, for the child's capacity to develop a social self."

George Herbert Mead described the creation of the self as the outcome of "taking the role of the other", the premise for which the self is actualized. Through interaction with others, we begin to develop an identity of our own as well as developing a capacity to empathize with others. As stated by Cooley, "The thing that moves us to pride or shame is not the mere mechanical reflection of ourselves, but an imputed sentiment, the imagined effect of this reflection upon another's mind" (Cooley 1964).

Role in social media 
The rise of social media very much reflects the mechanisms of the looking-glass self, as the different forms of social media offer all different "mirrors" in which individuals present themselves, perceive judgements of others based on likes, follows, etc., and further develop their sense of self. Indeed, as cyberpsychologist Mary Aiken, PhD. explains, social media has created a concept named the "cyber self," a version one wishes to portray online and to the public to others and based on the judgements of others. Unlike the real self, different forms of media allow judgements to be clearly posted, so in many cases, judgements may not even need to be imagined. Aiken explains this concept best, noting that "selfies ask a question of their audience: Like me like this?"

Far different from face-to-face interactions, social media is intended to be accessible and public at all times. This means social media users are constantly exposed to criticism and judgement from others. Additionally, given the nature of social media, being a platform to share certain aspects of an individual's life at any time and in any means possible, the cyber self can be very easily changed and perfected to fit the supposed acceptance of others.

These aspects of social media and its relationship with the looking-glass self present a whole range of effects on social media users. Aiken notes that individuals, and particularly teenagers, who are increasingly involved in updating their online personas, risk damaging the development of their real-world self. She also notes that this effect may be even greater among users who display all different sorts of "cyber selves" among different platforms with different purposes, such as between Twitter, Instagram, and LinkedIn. A social media study also uncovered a host of positive effects of the use of social media and in developing oneself, with dozens of creators citing that producing content gave them a sense of self-confidence and self-worth, enhanced their creativity, increased their sense of professionality, and their platforms offered a positive space to interact with others. The negative effects of the concept of the looking-glass self can be harmful to the people's mentality. According to Zsolt Unoka and Gabriella Vizin's To See In a Mirror Dimly. The Looking-Glass is Self-Shaming in Borderline Personality Disorder, shame is a large factor in the development of Borderline Personality Disorder. The feeling of shame and insufficient self-worth comes from traumatic experiences such as abuse, neglect, abandonment, shaming family situations, and harsh upbringing. The looking-glass self can cause feelings of insufficient self-worth and mental health issues.

According to Susan Harter's The Perceived Directionality of the Link Between Approval and Self-Worth: The Liabilities of a Looking Glass Self-Orientation Among Young Adolescents, self-worth in adolescents is based mainly on their peer's approval of them. In a world of social media, seeking attention and approval from others is how adolescents determine their self-worth. They create an image of themselves they think others will approve of. This is in close relation to the concept of the looking glass self. Adolescents experience anxiety and depression based on a low opinion of self-worth. They base this self-worth off other's opinions of them.

Studies
The term "looking-glass self" was coined by Cooley after extensive psychological testing in 1902.

Family study
In another study in the Journal of Family Psychology in 1998, researchers Cook and Douglas measured the validity of the looking glass self and symbolic interaction in the  context of familial relationships. The study analyzed the accuracy of a college student's and an adolescent's perceptions of how they are perceived by their parents, surveying mothers, fathers, college students, and adolescents.

Three areas were investigated: assertiveness, firmness, and cooperation. In reference to the three areas respondents were asked the following: how they behave toward the target, how the target behaves toward them, and how they think they are viewed by the target. The study identified the looking glass self as a "metaperception" because it involves "perception of perceptions."  One of the hypotheses tested in the study was: If "metaperceptions" cause self-perceptions they will necessarily be coordinated. The hypothesis was tested at the individual and relationship levels of analysis.

Findings
The study determined that the hypothesis is strongly supported at the individual level for cooperation for both college students and adolescents, but is only partially supported for assertiveness for college students.  Also for college students, at the relationship level with their mothers the study supported assertiveness. There was an irregular finding regarding firmness in the mother-adolescent relationship that indicated that the firmer adolescents were perceived by their mothers, the less firm they rated themselves in the relationship. While there was not strong support of the hypothesis on the relationship level, on the individual level the findings suggest that how college students and adolescents think about themselves is directly correlated to how they think they are perceived by their parents.

Social media study 
In 2015, Julie Jones, a professor at the University of Oklahoma, asked a range of questions to 46 Youtube producers to evaluate how producing in media has positively or negatively affected them. As Jones explains, "digital media can serve as a mediated mirror and social media sites provide the space where others' judgments are clearly posted."

Findings 
Of the Youtube producers asked, many noted that producing content gave them a sense of self-confidence and self-worth, enhanced their creativity, increased their sense of professionality, and their platforms offered a positive space to interact with others.

Critical perspectives

It has been argued that the looking glass self conceptualization of the social self is critically incomplete in that it overlooks the divergent roles of ingroups and outgroups in self-definition. That is, it has been demonstrated that while individuals will converge upon the attitudes and behaviours of ingroup members, they will also diverge from the attitudes and behaviours of outgroup members. The neglect of the latter scenario is attributed to the looking glass approaches' implicit focus on ingroup member appraisals. This alternative perspective is derived from the self-categorization theory analysis of social influence. Indeed, it is further argued that the looking glass self metaphor fails to reflect the fact that influence derives from the self-categorization of other individuals as part of the self. In other words, people are not shaped by the reflections from 'others', but rather are shaped by the creation of a collective social identity that contrasts 'us' against relevant 'others'. Therefore, the concept of self-identity may be considered  an example of a social construction.

See also

 Expectancy effect
 Michelangelo phenomenon
 Self-concept
 Symbolic interactionism

Notes

References

McGraw Hill Ryerson "Challenge and Change: Patterns, Trends and Shifts in Society" New York: 2012 pp. 130  for quote ""In Cooley's words, "I am not what I think I am and I am not what you think I am; I am what I think you think I am." ""

Cooley, Charles H. Human Nature and the Social Order. New York: Scribner's, 1902. Confer pp. 183–184 for first use of the term "looking glass self".
Cooley, Charles H. On Self and Social Organization. Ed. Schubert Hans-Joachim. Chicago: University of Chicago Press, 1998. . (pp. 20–22)

 Coser, Lewis A., Masters of Sociological Thought: Ideas in Historical and Social Context, New York: Harcourt Brace Jovanovich, 1971. . He has a chapter on Cooley and the Looking Glass Self.

McIntyre, Lisa. The Practical Skeptic: Core Concepts in Sociology. 3rd ed. New York: McGraw Hill, 2006. .
Shaffer, Leigh. "From Mirror Self-Recognition to the Looking-Glass Self: Exploring the Justification Hypothesis." Journal of Clinical Psychology 61 (January 2005): 47–65.
Starks, Rodney. Sociology. 10th ed. Belmont, CA: Thomson Wadsworth, 2007. . (pp. 73–75)

Conceptions of self